Caulonia is a comune (municipality) in the Province of Reggio Calabria in the Italian region Calabria, located about  southwest of Catanzaro and about  northeast of Reggio Calabria in the Stilaro Valley. Originally it was known as Castelvetere, but in 1862 the citizens decided to change the name of the town to that of the ancient city Caulonia. They believed that this city had been located on their territory, but it was eventually proved that ancient Caulonia was to be found near modern Monasterace,  to the northeast.

History

Late Antiquity and Middle Ages 
The origin of the town probably lies in Late Antiquity, when the settlement was known as Castrum Vetus.

In 1594 Castelvetere opposed a strong resistance to a brutal siege carried out by the massive Turkish army led by Sinan Cicala. Around 8000 armed forces besieged the fortified Castelvetere, administered by Marquis Fabrizio Carafa, as well as Prince of Terra della Roccella. The defense device, put in place by the Marquis, used the help under the command of Giovanni Marullo, Francesco Plutino and brothers Francesco and Carlo Siscara, noble citizens, displaced to preside the four urban gates. After a brutal battle, which lasted many hours, the siege is broken and the massive Turkish army, which had lost its commander-in-chief on the battlefield, is put on the run, chased by Castelveterin knights.

The town was ruled by various lords during the Middle Ages.  The Carafa family, from the Neapolitan nobility, was granted the town by King Ferdinand II of Aragon at the end of the fifteenth century. Fra' Gregorio Carafa was born here in 1615 and was the 62nd Prince and Grand Master of the Order of Malta from 1680 to 1690.

Modern period 
Caulonia was known as Castelvetere until 1862, when the town changed its name to Caulonia, following Calabria's integration with Italy during the Italian unification. The citizens did so to honor the ancient Greek city, which they thought was located in Castelvetere's territory. This belief proved to be mistaken, because almost three decades later the archaeologist Paolo Orsi proved conclusively that the ancient city was located at Punta Stilo, near Monasterace.

During the early 20th century, thousands of Cauloniesi migrated abroad.  The first waves of migrants went to the United States. Changes in U.S. immigration law in the 1920s, in part to reduce the number of southern European immigrants, caused Cauloniesi migration to shift to other venues, especially Australia, Canada, and Argentina, in the latter waves of twentieth century migration.

For five days in March 1945, with the fascist regime of Benito Mussolini overthrown, "Red Republic of Caulonia" led by an elementary school teacher named Pasquale Cavallaro, was proclaimed in Caulonia.  A communist, Cavallaro had been elected mayor of Caulonia in 1944.  The short-lived republic was the product of a peasants' revolt against abusive landowners.  Cavallaro resigned his mayorship to lead the revolt.  When the uprising was ultimately crushed, which required a military operation involving both Allied and carabinieri units, 350 Red Cauloniesi were put on trial in nearby Locri for sedition.  Most were ultimately pardoned, but Cavallaro himself served eight years in prison.

Major floods hit Caulonia and its surrounding hamlets in 1951 and 1953.  These floods, combined with ongoing emigration, caused significant declines in Caulonia's population, with the comune's center of economic activity now on the coast at the frazione of Marina di Caulonia. Many of the homes in Caulonia Superiore are vacant, though some of these abandoned buildings are occupied by squatting artists.

Festivals 

Festivals in Caulonia Superiore attract thousands, especially the annual "Kaulonia Tarantella Festival" or KTF in late August, which features live tarantella music and tarantella dancing workshops.

See also 

Vallata dello Stilaro Allaro
Ecomuseo delle ferriere e fonderie di Calabria
The town is featured in two of Michelangelo Frammartino's films: Il dono (2003) and Le quattro volte (2010).

References

External links 
 
Caulonia 2000
YouTube Video of Tarantella Power Festival in Caulonia
Society of Saint Hilarion (Cauloniese Migrants to Australia)
Family History Site of a Cauloniese Immigrant Family to U.S.

Cities and towns in Calabria
Vallata dello Stilaro